Fairfax is an incorporated town in Marin County, California, United States. The population was 7,605 at the 2020 census.

History
The Coast Miwok Native Americans occupied stretches along local creeks, spring and seep areas; moreover, prehistoric habitations were usually chosen near permanent and seasonal drainages, typically along flat ridges and terraces.

The town was named for Lord Charles Snowden Fairfax. In 1861, Fairfax was the site of the last political duel in California. Daniel Showalter and Charles W. Piercy, both former assemblymen in the state legislature, decided to settle a political dispute at the home of Lord Fairfax, a mutual friend. Although Fairfax provided lunch to both men and tried to talk them out of it, they eventually headed to an open field nearby and dueled, with Showalter killing Piercy.

The first post office opened in 1910. Fairfax became an incorporated town in 1931.

On May 16, 1946, a B-17 Flying Fortress bomber, crashed on White's Hill just west of Fairfax.

Geography
Fairfax is in eastern Marin County, bordered to the east by San Anselmo and to the north by unincorporated Sleepy Hollow. The community lies in the valleys of San Anselmo Creek and its tributary Fairfax Creek, and climbs the surrounding hills. It is bordered to the south by the Mount Tamalpais protected watershed.

Soils in the Fairfax area mostly belong to the Tocaloma Series as classified by the U.S. Soil Conservation Service.  These soils consist of moderately deep, well-drained soils on uplands.  These soils are typically formed from sandstone and shale and often occur on slopes ranging above 15 percent.

Demographics

2010
At the 2010 census Fairfax had a population of 7,441. The racial makeup of Fairfax was 6,617 (88.9%) White, 110 (1.5%) African American, 36 (0.5%) Native American, 204 (2.7%) Asian, 4 (0.1%) Pacific Islander, 174 (2.3%) from other races, and 296 (4.0%) from two or more races. Hispanic or Latino of any race were 504 people (6.8%).

The census reported that 7,419 people (99.7% of the population) lived in households, 12 (0.2%) lived in non-institutionalized group quarters, and 10 (0.1%) were institutionalized.

There were 3,379 households, 939 (27.8%) had children under the age of 18 living in them, 1,422 (42.1%) were opposite-sex married couples living together, 319 (9.4%) had a female householder with no husband present, 134 (4.0%) had a male householder with no wife present.  There were 267 (7.9%) unmarried opposite-sex partnerships, and 52 (1.5%) same-sex married couples or partnerships. 1,076 households (31.8%) were one person and 320 (9.5%) had someone living alone who was 65 or older. The average household size was 2.20.  There were 1,875 families (55.5% of households); the average family size was 2.77.

The age distribution was 1,436 people (19.3%) under the age of 18, 342 people (4.6%) aged 18 to 24, 1,806 people (24.3%) aged 25 to 44, 2,907 people (39.1%) aged 45 to 64, and 950 people (12.8%) who were 65 or older.  The median age was 45.9 years. For every 100 females, there were 94.2 males.  For every 100 females age 18 and over, there were 92.9 males.

There were 3,585 housing units at an average density of 1,626.9 per square mile, of the occupied units 2,103 (62.2%) were owner-occupied and 1,276 (37.8%) were rented. The homeowner vacancy rate was 0.9%; the rental vacancy rate was 4.9%.  4,917 people (66.1% of the population) lived in owner-occupied housing units and 2,502 people (33.6%) lived in rental housing units.

2000
At the 2000 census there were 7,319 people, 3,306 households, and 1,811 families in the town. The racial makeup of the town in 2010 was 85.4% non-Hispanic White, 1.4% non-Hispanic Black or African American, 0.3% Native American, 2.7% Asian, 0.1% Pacific Islander, 0.4% from other races, and 3.1% from two or more races. 6.8% of the population were Hispanic or Latino of any race.
Of the 3,306 households 27.4% had children under the age of 18 living with them, 41.2% were married couples living together, 10.0% had a female householder with no husband present, and 45.2% were non-families. 31.1% of households were one person and 7.4% were one person aged 65 or older.  The average household size was 2.20 and the average family size was 2.76.

The age distribution was 19.2% under the age of 18, 4.7% from 18 to 24, 33.5% from 25 to 44, 33.1% from 45 to 64, and 9.5% 65 or older.  The median age was 42 years. For every 100 females, there were 91.9 males.  For every 100 females age 18 and over, there were 89.2 males.

The median income for a household in the town was $58,465, and the median family income  was $68,308. Males had a median income of $51,457 versus $40,815 for females. The per capita income for the town was $34,080.  About 4.3% of families and 6.5% of the population were below the poverty line, including 6.6% of those under age 18 and 7.6% of those age 65 or over.

Culture
In the mid-1960s, a softball game between Jefferson Airplane and the Grateful Dead took place at Central Field (also known as Contratti Park), a public downtown baseball field.

Irving Berlin used to serenade from a treetop piano at Pastori's Hotel, formerly Bird's Nest Glen, the home of Lord Charles Snowden Fairfax, and later known as the Marin Town & Country Club.

The popularity of outdoor hot tubs soared after Al Garvey designed his own redwood hot tub in July 1966, installed outside Al and Barbara Garvey's home on Scenic Road on the hillside leading up to Fairfax Manor. The Garvey hot tub was used by hundreds of people in the first few months, including jazz musician John Handy, eccentric architect Roger Somers and sex worker/feminist Margo St. James. Barbara Garvey said, "We decided to make the hot tub a social enterprise and started throwing parties." Soon, many others had hot tubs of their own. The social fashion of hot-tubbing with friends became connected with Marin County culture and style.

Politics
In 2017, Fairfax had 5,602 registered voters. Of those, 3,726 (66.5%) are registered Democrats, 370 (6.6%) are registered Republicans, 1,528 (27.3%) have declined to state a political party and 155 (2.8%) are registered with the Green Party. In the 2016 US presidential election, Hillary Clinton received 85.43% of the vote, and Donald Trump received 7.63% of the vote.

Notable people

Births
Polly Klaas (1981-1993), girl killed by Richard Allen Davis
Lonnie Mayne (1944-1978), wrestler
Virgil Shaw, musician
Alfred Sorensen (1890-1984), writer and mystic

Deaths
Keith Donnellan (1931-2015), philosopher and professor
Andy Kulberg (1944-2002), musician
Chris Michie (1948-2003), musician
Robert Peterson (1924-2000), poet
Charles Wesley Piercy (1833-1861), politician; killed in a duel
David James Redford (1962-2020), filmmaker
Archie Williams (1915-1993), athlete and Air Force officer

References

External links

Fairfax Historical Society

1931 establishments in California
Cities in Marin County, California
Cities in the San Francisco Bay Area
Incorporated cities and towns in California